Miracle on 34th Street is a 1973 American made-for-television Christmas comedy-drama fantasy film directed by Fielder Cook. It is the third remake of the original 1947 film. Like the original, this film was produced by 20th Century Fox. Additionally, the New York City-based Macy's department store allowed their name to be used in this film, unlike the later version.

Plot
When an old man (Sebastian Cabot) spies the department store Santa Claus getting drunk before taking part in the Macy's Thanksgiving parade, he immediately locates and complains to Karen Walker (Jane Alexander), the parade director. She fires her Santa Claus and the old man, who turns out to be named Kris Kringle, volunteers to take his place for the sake of the children. Kris does so well during the parade that he is immediately hired to be the store's main Santa for the holiday period. At the same time, Karen's daughter, Susan (Suzanne Davidson), an intelligent but cynical six-year-old, meets her new neighbor, Bill Schafner (David Hartman), a lawyer, and decides to try and hook him up with her mother.

Kris, out of goodwill and to the horror of Mr. Schillhammer (Jim Backus), begins to send customers of Macy's to other stores if they can't find what they're looking for. In spite of Schillhammer's initial fear, the public embraces his actions as a goodwill marketing campaign and sales skyrocket, leading the profit obsessed Mr. Macy (David Doyle) to pursue the campaign in earnest. However, Karen and Shellhammer learn that Kris believes himself to actually be Santa Claus, a fact they frantically try to hide from their boss.

The store's psychiatrist, Dr. Sawyer, (Roddy McDowall) initially takes Kris on as a fascinating case study, but Kris' belief that it is Sawyer who has the problem leads to him becoming an enemy instead. Kris finds a kindred spirit in the janitor, Alfred (Barry Greenburg), who gets joy out of dressing as Santa at the local YMCA every year. He also learns that Susan has been raised not to believe in Santa Claus or possess an imagination, two things he intends to correct. Susan herself is further convinced of his authenticity because he possesses a real beard and in particular when he speaks Spanish to a young girl who doesn't speak English.

Through their friendship with Kris, who becomes Bill's roommate, Bill becomes closer to Karen, who is overworked and looking for companionship, and Susan begins to learn the value of imagination. She eventually asks Kris to get her a new house for Christmas to prove that he's Santa Claus, and later for help in ensuring Bill becomes her new father. Kris eventually passes the word on to Bill, who arranges for a real estate contract for Karen for a similar house and insists she buy the house for Susan's sake.

Sawyer's anger with Kris leads him to antagonize him and Alfred to the point that Kris throws a pie in his face during an encounter in the lunchroom. Reluctantly, Karen agrees to allow Sawyer to evaluate him again. After Kris helps Alfred with his yearly Santa Claus routine, Dr. Sawyer confronts him and lies to Kris and tells him that Karen believes him to be a menace. In light of this, Kris deliberately fails every one of his tests at Bellevue, leading to the hospital to recommend his commitment.

Kris reveals to Bill that he intends for Bill to get him off, making Bill realize that Kris wants the confrontation for the sake of proving to the world that he is the one and only Santa Claus. An angered Bill agrees, and a commitment hearing begins in which Judge Henry Harper (Tom Bosley) and D.A. Thomas Mara (James Gregory) reluctantly move forward with the case despite the terrible press it's giving their political ambitions.

During the course of the hearing, Mr. Macy is placed on the stand and upon contemplating the terrible press and lost sales if he declared his own Santa a fraud, he declares he believes in Kris and fires Sawyer before he leaves the courtroom. Similarly, Harper and Mara are eventually pressed to declare that Santa Claus is real when Bill points out the terrible press, but the D.A. demands that Bill prove Kris is the one and only Santa Claus.

Bill and Karen are about to give up on the case as hopeless when Susan gives Bill a letter to pass on to Kris, and Bill realizes that hundreds of children write to him every year. He quickly manipulates the court to recognize the authority of the Postal Service, and arranges the post office to deliver all of Santa's mail to the court. As Bill papers the court room in Kris' mail, Judge Harper dismisses the case in Kris' favor (as he quietly slips a letter of his own into the pile).

At the celebration at the memorial home, Susan loses faith in Kris when she doesn't get her house. However, on the way back into New York, Bill and Karen drive her past the house she asked for, leading Susan to rush inside and find it even has the swing she asked for. As Karen and Bill discover Kris's distinct cane, they realize he made the arrangements and declare their love for each other.

Cast
 Sebastian Cabot as Kris Kringle
 Jane Alexander as Karen Walker
 David Hartman as Bill Schaffner
 Roddy McDowall as Dr. Henry Sawyer
 Suzanne Davidson as Susan Walker
 Jim Backus as Horace Shellhammer
 Barry Greenberg as Alfred
 David Doyle as R.H. Macy
 Tom Bosley as Judge Henry X. Harper
 James Gregory as Deputy District Attorney Thomas J. Mara
 Roland Winters as Mr. Gimbel
 Liam Dunn as Mr. Tucker
 Conrad Janis as Dr. Pierce
 Ellen Weston as Celeste
 Jason Wingreen as Halloran
 Burt Mustin as Roy

Production 

Though Sebastian Cabot was known for having a beard at the time the film was made, he instead shaved it off and wore a false beard for this role due to the make-up artists failing at whitening his natural beard. Notably, the dialog in which Susan discovers his beard is real is still kept.

Natalie Wood, who played Susan in the original film, was originally offered the role of Karen Walker, with the idea that her real life daughter would play Susan and Robert Wagner, her husband at the time, would play Bill Schaffer. Wood declined due to concerns over her daughter being too young to start acting.

The film was very clearly shot during the summer as many outdoor shots depict lush, green trees.

Critical reception
In The New York Times, Howard Thompson  
wondered why a network would bother to remake a seasonal favourite like the original movie, but opined "it has matched the Hollywood film very nicely...Norman Rosemont's expansive production has real seasonal gleam." The reviewer praised a "winning cast," especially Sebastian Cabot: "charming," although "No Santa, of course, could match the gentle whimsey of the late Edmund Gwenn in the movie," concluding that "Two good “Miracles” should make the season merrier."

See also
 Miracle on 34th Street (1947)
 Miracle on 34th Street (1994)
 List of Christmas films

References

External links
 

1973 films
1973 television films
1970s Christmas films
1973 drama films
1970s fantasy films
American children's fantasy films
American Christmas films
American children's drama films
American courtroom films
Remakes of American films
American Sign Language films
Christmas television films
Television remakes of films
CBS network films
Films about lawyers
Films directed by Fielder Cook
Films set in department stores
Films set in Manhattan
Films set in New York City
Films shot in New York City
Miracle on 34th Street
Santa Claus in film
Santa Claus in television
20th Century Fox Television films
American drama television films
1970s English-language films
1970s American films